Hammar Lacus is one of a number of hydrocarbon seas and lakes found on Saturn's largest moon, Titan.

The lake is located at latitude 48.6°N and longitude 308.29° W on Titan's globe, and is composed of liquid methane and ethane, At 200 km in diameter it is the third largest lake on Titan and is named after Hammar Lake in southern Iraq, its name being adopted by the IAU on Dec 3, 2013. Its area is given as 18600 km2.

Notes

References

Lakes of Titan (moon)